Felimare lapislazuli is a species of sea slug or dorid nudibranch, a marine gastropod mollusk in the family Chromodorididae.

Distribution
This nudibranch is known only from the Galapagos Islands.

Description
Felimare lapislazuli has a black body covered in yellow and blue spots and a white mantle edge. The gills are white and the rhinophores exhibit the same pattern as the body. This species can reach a total length of at least .

References

Chromodorididae
Gastropods described in 1971